Sir John Stanhope Arkwright (10 July 1872 – 19 September 1954) was a British Conservative Party politician.

Family life
Born in London, he was the great-great grandson of the cotton-spinning industrialist Sir Richard Arkwright and the son of John Hungerford Arkwright. His uncle, Richard Arkwright, was Member of Parliament (MP) for Leominster. In 1910, he sold his family home, Hampton Court, near Leominster and purchased Kinsham Court.

Career
At the 1900 general election he was elected as MP for Hereford, a position he served in until his resignation in 1912.
In April 1902 he was appointed private secretary (unpaid) to Gerald Balfour, President of the Board of Trade.

He was the author of the hymn 'O Valiant Hearts' written to honour the war dead of World War I.

In the 1934 New Years Honours List he was knighted and in the same year was made an Honorary Freeman of the City of Hereford.

Sources
The Oxford Dictionary of National Biography (includes photo)

References

External links 
 

Knights Bachelor
Conservative Party (UK) MPs for English constituencies
Politicians awarded knighthoods
UK MPs 1900–1906
UK MPs 1906–1910
UK MPs 1910
UK MPs 1910–1918
1872 births
1954 deaths